PKMM Higher Secondary School Edarikode, or locally known as Edarikode School, is a higher secondary school in Edarikode, Malappuram district of Kerala state in India. It is the school in Kerala, where the maximum number of students appear for the Secondary School Leaving Certificate. The school is best known for the maximum number of A+ in Kerala. The school is also known for its better performance in the Kerala School Kalolsavam. The institution was established in the year 1979. The school has shown its excellency in curricular and extra-curricular activities.

History 
It was started as a Pallikoodam and in 1979 it was transformed as a school. In 2000, it was upgraded into a Higher Secondary School.

References

External links 
 Official website of PKMMHSS Edarikode

Schools in Malappuram district